The 10th Mechanized Corps was a formation in the Soviet Red Army during the Second World War.

First formation 
Initially formed in March 1941 in response the German victories of 1940 it was attached to the Leningrad Military District, & held in reserve near Leningrad Fortified Region in Soviet Union It was under the command of Major General I.G. Lazarev when the German Operation Barbarossa began in June 1941. It initially comprised the 21st and 24th Tank Divisions, & the 198th Mechanized Division. 

The 10th Mechanized Corps was transported to Finish border near Imatra, so it was not involved in the first battles of Operation Barbarossa, being brought out of reserve on 10 July 1941. From that date it formed part of the Luga Operational Group under the command of Lieutenant General K. P. Piadyshev, defending the 'Luga Line'. The Luga Line defences were constructed by 55,000 civilians & which and extended from Narva to Shimsk on Lake Ilmen. It first engaged 8th Panzer Division on 13 July 1941 along with the 177th Rifle Division isolating it from its neighbouring divisions for several days around Dno & costing it 70 of its 150 tanks destroyed or damaged.

However the Luga Operational Group was encircled & destroyed on 8 August 1941 near Krasnogvardeisk which resulted in losses of 30,000 men, 120 tanks, and 400 guns. The 10th Mechanized Corps was officially disbanded a short time later although individual units continued to exist separately for a short while.

By September 1941 the 198th Mechanized Division had become the 198th Rifle Division and the 24th Tank Division had been dissolved and reformed as the 124th Tank Battalion and 12th Tank Regiment.

Second Formation 

A second 10th Mechanized Corps was formed in December 1944, but it was only combat ready in summer 1945. 
It was part of the active army from August 9 to September 3, 1945. and took part in the Harbin–Kirin Offensive Operation during the Soviet invasion of Manchuria.

After the war, the corps was reorganized in January 1946 into the 10th Mechanized Division (military unit 71516), which was part of the 25th Army of the Primorsky Military District. Until 1948, it was stationed in Korea along with other units of the 25th Army. Then it was withdrawn to the USSR, transferred to the 5th Army, the staff was stationed in the village of Sibirtsevo, Primorsky Territory.

In 1957, it was reorganized into the 84th Motorized Rifle Division, stationed in the town of Suchan, Primorsky Territory. The division was disbanded on July 1, 1958.

Footnotes
On 22 June 1941 10th Mechanized Corps consisted 26,168 Men, 469 Tanks, 86 Armoured Cars, 75 Artillery Pieces, 157 Mortars, 1000 Vehicles, 34 Tractors & 460 Motorcycles including lighter models T-26, Bt 7, & T-28's models.
On 11 July 1941 Col P Poluboiarov, Northwestern Front armoured directorate reported that from 10 July, the 21st Tank Division of the 10th Mechanized Corps was put at the disposal of the front. It consisted of one tank regiment, a motorized rifle regiment, an artillery battalion, & other divisional units. It had around 100 old light tanks.

Sources & References

Further reading 
 Brian Taylor, Barbarossa To Berlin A Chronology of the Campaigns on the Eastern Front 1941 to 1945, 2003, Spellmount Ltd, 
 David Glantz (1998), 'Stumbling Colossus – The Red Army on the Eve of World War', Kansas. 
 David Glantz (2002), 'The Battle for Leningrad 1941–1944', Kansas. 
 Christer Bergstrom, (2007) 'Barbarossa – The Air Battle: July–December 1941, Ian Allan Publishing.

Mechanized corps of the Soviet Union
Military units and formations established in 1941
Military units and formations disestablished in 1959